Edmund Wilson (1895–1972) was an American writer and critic. Other people with the name include:

 Edmund Wilson (physician) (1583–1633), British physician
 Edmund Wilson Sr. (1863–1923), American lawyer and Attorney General of New Jersey
 Edmund Beecher Wilson (1856–1939), American zoologist and geneticist

See also
 Edward Wilson (disambiguation)
 Edwin Wilson (disambiguation)